Helen M. Grace is a Welsh film director (Are You Ready for Love?).

Background
She graduated in Law at Cambridge University before training in film directing and screenwriting.

Awards
Best Director, Are You Ready For Love?, Monaco International Film Festival, 2006.
Best screenwriter, Are You Ready For Love?, Monaco International Film Festival, 2006.
Nominated: Best Short Film BAFTA Cymru Awards 2004/5.

References

Mass media people from Cardiff
Welsh women film directors
Living people
Alumni of the University of Cambridge
Place of birth missing (living people)
Year of birth missing (living people)